Daigou is an emerging form of cross-border exporting in which an individual or a syndicated group of exporters outside China purchases commodities (mainly luxury goods, but sometimes also groceries such as infant formulas) for customers in China. Daigou shoppers typically purchase the desired goods in a region outside China, after which they post the goods to China or carry them in their luggage when they return to China. The goods are then sold for profit in China.

Daigou activities can be conducted illegally, or legally, using loopholes to circumvent import tariffs imposed on overseas goods.

Sales
Daigou sales across sectors total $15 billion annually. In 2014 the value of the daigou business just in luxury goods increased from CN¥55 billion to CN¥75 billion yuan (US$8.8 billion to $12 billion).

Daigou purchases are often made in luxury brand boutiques in major fashion cities like Paris, London, New York City, Hong Kong, Tokyo and Seoul. Some daigou operators use Weibo and WeChat to communicate with their clients.  
The large demand for daigou service is due to  perceived high import tariffs on luxury goods and concern over unsafe products, especially food safety problems, Daigou shoppers can provide assurance that the products which consumers in China order are genuine and safe to use. Shoppers often have personal connections with the people in China who order from them.

A 2015 survey of Chinese online luxury shoppers found that 35% have used daigou to purchase luxury goods online, while only 7% used the website of the brand they are buying, or think they are buying.
Approximately 80% of Chinese luxury purchases are made abroad.

Negative impacts

Daigou syndicates can be involved in hoarding and stockpiling of goods in large quantities, often infuriating local customers for the shortage of goods and disruption incurred to the markets. 
	
In June 2019 naval personnel from a Chinese warship berthed in Sydney Harbour, Australia were photographed unloading boxes of baby formula and other products from a large van to carry onto the ship.

In January and February 2020, in response to the COVID-19 pandemic, China's United Front organized successful Daigou in numerous countries to help China import 2.5 billion pieces of epidemic safety equipment, including over two billion safety masks. The Australian subsidiaries of Country Garden and Greenland Holdings had their employees gather medical supplies which were subsequently airlifted to Wuhan, exacerbating these shortages in Australian hospitals. Jorge Guajardo, Mexico’s former ambassador to China, suggested that China was evidently hiding the extent of a pandemic that endangered the world while covertly securing PPE at low prices, as this “surreptitious” operation left “the world naked with no supply of PPE.”  

Such actions have prompted several governments to take actions against Daigou smuggling and hoarding. Starting from 2012, the New Zealand government has been regularly cracking down and sometimes outright banning unauthorized export of consumer goods through unregistered channels. Australian retailers have imposed multiple restrictions on Daigou purchases of baby formula.

Some Daigou service providers fraudulently sell counterfeit products that have been altered to appear purchased abroad from legitimate sources.

Responses from China

On January 1, 2019, China officially rolled out a new e-commerce law, the first of its kind to directly regulate Daigou activities. Under the new law, all Daigou participants will be legally required to register as e-commerce operators and acquire licenses in both China and the country where they shop, making their business subject to taxation in both China and the region where they purchased goods. Any e-commerce platform and seller could be fined 2 million yuan and 500,000 yuan respectively, and possibly face criminal charges, if they are found guilty of smuggling, tax evasion and willful violation of the new e-commerce law.

See also
Parallel trading in Hong Kong

References

External links

JINGDAILY: daigou

Retail processes and techniques
Smuggling
Business terms
Tax evasion
Tax avoidance
Chinese-speaking people by occupation
Sales occupations
Retailing-related crime